Bound for Glory may refer to:

 Bound for Glory (book), a 1943 autobiography by Woody Guthrie
 Bound for Glory (album), a 1956 album by Woody Guthrie and Will Geer
 Bound for Glory (1976 film), a 1976 film based on the book, starring David Carradine
 Bound for Glory (1975 film), a Canadian drama film
 Bound for Glory (TV series), a 2005 American sports documentary series
 "Bound for Glory" (song), a 1990 song by Angry Anderson
 "Bound for Glory", a song by Phil Ochs from his 1964 album All the News That's Fit to Sing
 Bound for Glory, a 1995 EP by Fat Day
 Bound for Glory (wrestling pay-per-view), a professional wrestling pay-per-view event produced by Impact Wrestling